Kulif is a rural locality (a selo) in Dzhuldzhagsky Selsoviet, Tabasaransky District, Republic of Dagestan, Russia. The population was 623 as of 2010.

Geography 
Kulif is located 10 km northwest of Khuchni (the district's administrative centre) by road. Yurgulig is the nearest rural locality.

References 

Rural localities in Tabasaransky District